This table lists those stars/objects which have Flamsteed designations by the constellation in which those stars/objects lie. The name given is that of the article if it does not reflect the Flamsteed designation.  Some articles are linked twice, in cases where the star has been assigned two different Flamsteed designations, usually as noted in different constellations.

See also 
 List of constellations
 Table of stars with Bayer designations

Notes 

Lists of stars